The Harra Covered Bridge is a historic wooden covered bridge in Washington County, Ohio, United States. Among the bridge's more distinctive features are its cut stone abutments, its metal roof, and the vertical siding. Although it has been open for well over one hundred years, it remains in strong structural condition, and it served daily traffic into the late twentieth century.

A single-span structure completed in 1875, the bridge was constructed under the leadership of Marietta bridge builder William Meredith.  One of his primary employees was stonemason Billy Gamble, who used locally quarried stone to construct the abutments.  The source for this stone was the farm of James Harrah, whose name (minus its final letter) was given to the bridge.  The plan for the bridge used the Long truss design; fewer than ten historic Long truss bridges remain in Ohio today.  In 1976, the Harra Bridge was listed on the National Register of Historic Places, qualifying both because of its historically significant architecture and because of its importance in the history of Ohio.

References

Bridges completed in 1875
Covered bridges on the National Register of Historic Places in Ohio
Bridges in Washington County, Ohio
National Register of Historic Places in Washington County, Ohio
Wooden bridges in Ohio
Tourist attractions in Washington County, Ohio
Road bridges on the National Register of Historic Places in Ohio
Long truss bridges in the United States